Nanger is a genus of antelopes, commonly called gazelles. Nanger was originally considered a subgenus within the genus Gazella, but has since been elevated to genus status. The three living species within the genus Nanger are:

  Nanger vanhoepeni†

References

 
Antilopini
Mammal genera
Fauna of Sub-Saharan Africa